The Democratic People's Republic of Angola was a rival government to that of the People's Republic of Angola. 

It was declared by the FNLA and UNITA in the city of Huambo. It was formed during the dawn of Angolan independence, in November 1975, though by February 1976, its FNLA forces had been largely defeated by the MPLA of the People's Republic of Angola. It was supported by South Africa and United States.

See also
List of heads of state of the Democratic People's Republic of Angola
List of heads of government of the Democratic People's Republic of Angola

References

Politics of Angola